Pr0201 b (also written Pr 0201 b) is an exoplanet orbiting around the F-type main-sequence star Pr0201. Pr0201 b along with Pr0211 b are notable for being the first exoplanets discovered in the Beehive Cluster located in the constellation Cancer. Since Pr0201 b has a mass of about half of Jupiter and an orbital period of about 4 days, it is likely a hot Jupiter. Its host star, Pr0201, is rotationally variable and has a rotation period of 5.63 days.

Discovery
Pr0201 b and Pr 0211 b were discovered in 2012 by Sam Quinn and his colleagues while observing 53 stars in the Beehive cluster using the  telescope at the University of Georgia in the United States.

References

Exoplanets discovered in 2012
Exoplanets detected by radial velocity
Cancer (constellation)
Hot Jupiters